St Rynagh's is the name of two Gaelic Athletic Association sister clubs that encompass the towns of Cloghan and Banagher in County Offaly, in Ireland. The St Rynagh's Football Club is based in Cloghan and wear green and white hooped jerseys; the St Rynagh's Hurling Club is based in Banagher and wear blue and gold jerseys.

History
Formed in 1961, to represent the parish of Cloghan and Banagher, the club gained almost immediate success - winning the senior hurling championship in 1965. The St Rynagh's Hurling Club went on to appear in three All-Ireland club hurling finals during the next 30 years.

St Rynagh's has also supplied three of Offaly's four All-Ireland Hurling Championship winning captains, namely Padraig Horan, Martin Hanamy and Hubert Rigney. Other noted players in the club's history include RTÉ pundit Michael Duignan, Pad Joe Whelahan, Aidan Fogarty and Declan Fogarty, David Hughes, Tom and Mícheál Conneely, and first ever all-star goalkeeper Damien Martin. In 2017, Padraig Horan was inducted into the GAA Hall of Fame.

In football, Greg Hughes and Dinny Wynne won the All-Ireland Senior Football Championship with Offaly in 1971 and 1982, respectively.

The club enters teams for all major codes, and continues to have players which represent Offaly on both the hurling and football county teams.

St Rynagh's have won the Minor, Under 16, and Under 14 Offaly championships in 2007, while also reaching the Semi-Final at the 2007 Féile na nGael in Kilkenny. The Under 14 football squad captured the Division 3 title at Feile Peil na nÓg also.

Honours

Hurling 
 Leinster Senior Club Hurling Championships (4): 1970, 1972, 1982, 1993
 Offaly Senior Hurling Championships (20): 1965, 1966, 1968, 1969, 1970, 1972, 1973, 1974, 1975, 1976, 1981, 1982, 1987, 1990, 1992, 1993, 2016, 2019, 2020, 2021
 Offaly Senior B Hurling Championship (1): 1989
 Offaly Intermediate Hurling Championship (4): 1978, 1987, 1992, 1993
 Offaly Junior A Hurling Championship (7): 1934 (Banagher), 1940 (Banagher), 1942 (Cloghan), 1963, 1975, 2004, 2011
 Offaly Minor Hurling Championship (20): 1942 (Banagher), 1946 (Banagher), 1947 (Banagher), 1948 (Banagher), 1961, 1962, 1963, 1965, 1972, 1973, 1974, 1975, 1976, 1977, 1982, 1986, 2005, 2007, 2009, 2010

Football 
 Offaly Senior Football Championships (3): 1903 (Cloghan), 1910 (Banagher), 1945 (Cloghan)  
 Offaly Senior B Football Championship (1): 1988
 Offaly Intermediate Football Championship (11): 1910 (Banagher), 1913 (Banagher), 1915 (Cloghan), 1929 (Cloghan), 1934 (Cloghan), 1939 (Cloghan), 1980, 1986, 2005, 2010, 2020
 Offaly Junior Football Championship (2): 1974, 1975
 Offaly Minor Football Championship (5): 1931 (Cloghan), 1940 (Cloghan), 1941 (Cloghan), 1961, 1968

Camogie 
 All-Ireland Intermediate Club Camogie Championship (2): 2020, 2021
 Offaly Senior Camogie Championships (5): 2017, 2018, 2019, 2020, 2021
 Offaly Junior A Camogie Championship (1): 1997
 Offaly Junior B Camogie Championships (3): 2010, 2019, 2020
 Offaly Minor A Camogie Championships (2): 2012, 2013
 Offaly Minor B Camogie Championship (1): 2008
 Offaly Minor C Camogie Championship (1): 2019

Ladies Football 
 Offaly Senior Ladies Football Championship (1): 2012
 Offaly Minor Ladies Football Championship (1): 2010

Notable players
 Tom Conneely
 Michael Duignan
 Aidan Fogarty
 Declan Fogarty
 Martin Hanamy
 Padraig Horan
 David Hughes
 Damien Martin
 Shane McGuckin
 Barney Moylan
 Pat Moylan
Sean Moylan

References

External links

Gaelic games clubs in County Offaly
Hurling clubs in County Offaly
Gaelic football clubs in County Offaly